The 1970 Clemson Tigers football team was an American football team that represented Clemson University in the Atlantic Coast Conference (ACC) during the 1970 NCAA University Division football season. In its first season under head coach Hootie Ingram, the team compiled a 3–8 record (2–4 against conference opponents), tied for sixth place in the ACC, and was outscored by a total of 313 to 164. The team played its home games at Memorial Stadium in Clemson, South Carolina.

B. B. Elvington, Jim Sursavage, and Ray Yauger were the team captains. The team's statistical leaders included quarterback Tommy Kendrick with 1,407 passing yards, running back Ray Yauger with 711 rushing yards and 30 points scored (5 touchdowns), and John McMakin with 532 receiving yards.

Two Clemson players were selected by the Associated Press as first-team players on the 1970 All-Atlantic Coast Conference football team: offensive guard Dave Thompson and defensive back Don Kelley.

Schedule

References

Clemson
Clemson Tigers football seasons
Clemson Tigers football